is an artist, curator and essayist based in Helsinge, Denmark since 1997. The first exhibition in Denmark was in 1996, container '96 in Copenhagen.

After she moved to Denmark in 1997, she had many exhibitions there as well as other European countries and in Japan. Since 2002, she has been working as a curator, and has invited many Japanese artists to Denmark. On the occasion of one of her projects, she started a collaborative concert at her exhibitions.  She has also written some essays in Japanese newspapers, magazines and so on. From 2004 to 2010, she wrote essays for JMM (Japanese Mail Media) as a Japanese citizen residing abroad. Her book written about Danish life was published in 2005, from NHK Publishing Co., Ltd.

Biography 
 1958 Born in Osaka
 1981 B.F.A. Kyoto City University of Art
 1983 M.F.A. Kyoto City University of Art
 ~1997 Associate Professor; Department of Creative Arts, Seian College of Art and Design (Osaka Seikei University) 
 1997 Move to Denmark

Public collection 
 National Museum of Art, Osaka
 Portalen
 Seiryukai Kyoto Japan
 Hillerød Bibliotek

Commission Work 
 Hayashima Town Hall, Okayama Japan
 över gården

References

External links 
 Yuko Takada Keller Official website

1958 births
Living people
20th-century Japanese women artists
20th-century Japanese artists
21st-century Japanese women artists
21st-century Japanese artists
Japanese essayists
People from Osaka
Japanese women essayists
People from Gribskov Municipality
Japanese women curators
Danish women curators